K. P. Paramasivam is an Indian politician and incumbent member of the Tamil Nadu Legislative Assembly from the Palladam constituency. He represents the Anna Dravida Munnetra Kazhagam party.

References 

All India Anna Dravida Munnetra Kazhagam politicians
Living people
Year of birth missing (living people)
Tamil Nadu MLAs 2011–2016